Econazole/triamcinolone is a combination drug, consisting of econazole (an imidazole antifungal) and triamcinolone (a group III topical steroid).

It is used as a topical cream against fungal skin infections, including Trichophyton mentagrophytes, T. rubrum, Epidermophyton floccosum and Candida albicans.

References 

Combination drugs
Imidazole antifungals
Lanosterol 14α-demethylase inhibitors